The Life and Times of a Sentinel is a Hong Kong television drama produced by Television Broadcasts Limited (TVB). Some of the characters' names listed below are in Cantonese romanisation.

Qing Dynasty

Imperial Harem

Nip Family

Kei Family

Imperial Guard

Others

See also
The Life and Times of a Sentinel

References
The Life and Times of a Sentinel at TVB.com

Life and Times of a Sentinel, The
Life and Times of a Sentinel, The